L. Greif and Bro., Inc. Manufactory is a historic factory building located at Baltimore, Maryland, United States. It is a three-story brick and steel industrial building constructed about 1914–15. It features an expanse of multi-light steel windows, a metal cornice, and sawtooth monitors. It served as a clothing factory for L. Greif & Bro., Inc., makers of the men's clothing brand, 'Griffin,' and for a time the country's second-largest men's clothing company. The company was sold to a national conglomerate in 1957.

L. Grief and Bro., Inc. Manufactory was listed on the National Register of Historic Places in 2007.

References

External links
 at Maryland Historical Trust

Buildings and structures in Baltimore
Industrial buildings and structures on the National Register of Historic Places in Baltimore
Industrial buildings completed in 1915